Guzel Khubbieva (born 2 May 1976) is an Uzbekistani sprinter who specializes in the 100 and 200 metres.

Khubbieva represented Uzbekistan at the 2008 Summer Olympics in Beijing competing at the 100 metres sprint. In her first round heat she placed third behind Muna Lee and Anita Pistone in a time of 11.44 to advance to the second round. There she failed to qualify for the semi finals as her time of 11.49 was only the seventh time of her heat, causing elimination.  She won the silver medal at the 2010 Asian Games.  She also competed at the 2012 Summer Olympics.  She didn't qualify for the second round.

Competition record

Personal bests
60 metres – 7.19 s (2005)
100 metres – 11.20 s (2007)
200 metres – 23.16 s (2004)

References

External links
 

1976 births
Living people
Uzbekistani female sprinters
Athletes (track and field) at the 2000 Summer Olympics
Athletes (track and field) at the 2004 Summer Olympics
Athletes (track and field) at the 2008 Summer Olympics
Athletes (track and field) at the 2012 Summer Olympics
Olympic athletes of Uzbekistan
Asian Games medalists in athletics (track and field)
Athletes (track and field) at the 1998 Asian Games
Athletes (track and field) at the 2002 Asian Games
Athletes (track and field) at the 2006 Asian Games
Athletes (track and field) at the 2010 Asian Games
Asian Games gold medalists for Uzbekistan
Asian Games silver medalists for Uzbekistan
Asian Games bronze medalists for Uzbekistan
World Athletics Championships athletes for Uzbekistan
Medalists at the 1998 Asian Games
Medalists at the 2002 Asian Games
Medalists at the 2006 Asian Games
Medalists at the 2010 Asian Games
Olympic female sprinters
20th-century Uzbekistani women
21st-century Uzbekistani women